International Gladiators 1 was the first international competition of the Gladiators franchise, consisting of seven episodes. Held at the National Indoor Arena, Birmingham, England, the competition pitted contenders and Gladiators from the United States (American Gladiators), the United Kingdom (Gladiators), Finland (Gladiaattorit) and Russia, who did not have a domestic series at the time of production, against one another.

This was the final series in the Gladiators franchise to star British Gladiators Scorpio (Nikki Diamond) and Shadow (Jefferson King). Diamond retired at the end of the series, while King was fired after having been discovered to have taken steroids. Following the serious injury to Panther (Helen O'Reilly) during the third British domestic series, Tilt was dropped for this series. Neither Atlaspheres nor Danger Zone appeared in this series either, for reasons undisclosed. Joust made only its second appearance during any competition during the 1995 season, after only appearing once during the third British domestic series. Eunice Huthart and Wesley Berry emerged as the eventual winners of the series.

Contenders

Gladiators

Episodes

References

Gladiators (franchise)